2016–17 is the 32nd Sri Lanka Football Premier League season.

The defending champions are Colombo Football Club. They have regained the champions title for the second time by defeating Renown SC 3–1 in the championship round.

Teams Allocation 

If this season is playing according to the previous season. The competition was played with 18 teams. The teams were divided into two groups of nine. The teams played round robin matches and the four group best teams of each group qualified for the Final Stage. In that stage all the eight teams will play round robin matches and the team that take first place in the group will be the Champions.Pelicans SC, Highlanders SC, Kalutara Park SC and Don Bosco were relegated in the previous tournament.

Clubs

League table

Group A

Group B

Result table

Group A

Group B

Championship Round

Result table

Awards 
The winners of the competition were given a cash award of Rs. 700000.

Controversies 

 This edition of the league was highly criticized by the clubs due to the poor management of the tournament. This has occurred in the Super 8 Stage when the Round has to postponed in number of occasions. Many clubs have make their dissatisfaction in this incident.
 The fixtures of Championship Round was again postponed to mid of January due to the monsoon rain.

References

External links 
 http://www.thepapare.com/football
 https://web.archive.org/web/20150218082614/http://www.football.lk/

Sri Lanka Football Premier League seasons
1
Sri Lanka